The Durango chipmunk (Neotamias durangae) is a species of rodent in the family Sciuridae. It is endemic to Mexico.

Distribution
This species has a disjunct distribution, with populations in the Sierra Madre Occidental and Sierra Madre Oriental of northern Mexico. In the Sierra Madre Occidental it is found from southwestern Chihuahua to southern Durango, in humid areas between 1,980 to 2,590 meters elevation. The eastern population lives in the northern Sierra Madre Oriental and the Sierra del Carmen of Coahuila, where is ranges from 2,590 to 2,900 meters elevation.

References

Endemic mammals of Mexico
Fauna of the Sierra Madre Occidental
Fauna of the Sierra Madre Oriental
Neotamias
Mammals described in 1903
Taxonomy articles created by Polbot